California is the third studio album and the first covers album by American female group Wilson Phillips. The group reunited in 2003 to record their first studio album in twelve years released by Columbia Records. The album peaked at #35 on the Billboard 200, and sold 31,000 copies during the first week of its release.

Track listing

A "limited edition" was also released that featured a hidden track that is only listed on a sticker affixed to the CD case.

Personnel 

Wilson Phillips
 Chynna Phillips – lead vocals (1, 4-7, 10, 11), backing vocals, vocal arrangements
 Carnie Wilson – lead vocals (2, 4-6, 8, 10, 11), backing vocals, additional keyboards (6), vocal arrangements
 Wendy Wilson – lead vocals (3-6, 9-11), backing vocals, vocal arrangements

Musicians
 Jon Gilutin – Hammond B3 organ (1, 4, 9)
 Roger Manning – Mellotron (1), acoustic piano (2, 7), Wurlitzer electric piano (9), Farfisa organ (10)
 Brian Wilson – acoustic piano (11), special guest vocals (11)
 Dean Parks – electric guitar (1, 3-5, 7-9), acoustic guitar (4, 6), mandolin (5), lead electric guitar (10)
 David Rolfe – fuzz bass (1), acoustic guitar (2, 3, 5, 8, 10), electric guitar (2, 7, 9), percussion programming (2, 10), acoustic hi-strung guitar (4)
 Dan Dugmore – pedal steel guitar (2, 3)
 Ron Bonfilogo – lead electric guitar (4), 12-string acoustic guitar (6, 10), baritone guitar (6), electric guitar (9)
 Larry Klein – bass (1-3, 5, 6)
 Leland Sklar – bass (4, 7-10) 
 Russ Kunkel – drums (2-10), tambourine (4, 10), maracas (7), congas (9)
 Peter Asher – percussion programming (6, 10), additional percussion (9), sleigh bells (10)
 Jay Ruston – percussion programming (6)
 David Campbell – orchestral arrangements and conductor (3, 5, 7, 9, 10)
 Larry Corbett, Joel Derouin, Michele Richards and Evan Wilson – string quartet (2, 6, 8)
 Linda Ronstadt – special guest vocal sample (1)
 Owen Elliot – additional backing vocals (7)
 Dance Party Chorus on "Dance Dance Dance" – Peter Asher, Jameson Baldwin, Vance Baldwin, William Baldwin, Rob Bonfilogo, Maria Carcamo, Tiffany Miller, Chynna Phillips, Michelle Phillips, Jay Ruston, René Succa, Dave Way, Aron Wilson, Carnie Wilson and Wendy Wilson

Production 
 Producer – Peter Asher
 Co-Producer – David Rolfe
 Executive Producers – Tiffany Miller and Sherratt Reicher
 Additional Vocal Production – Wilson Phillips 
 Tracks recorded by Nathaniel Kunkel, assisted by John Morrical.
 Vocals and Overdubs recorded by Jay Ruston, assisted by Tony Rambo.
 Pedal steel guitar recorded by George Massenberg, assisted by Leslie Richter.
 Strings recorded by Steve Churchyard, assisted by Jason Gossman.
 Mixing – Dave Way (Tracks 1, 2, 4, 6, 7, 9 & 10); Jay Ruston (Tracks 3, 5, 8 & 11).
 Recorded and Overdubbed at Conway Studios (Hollywood, California) and The Park Studios (Studio City, California).
 Mastered by Doug Sax and Robert Hadley at The Mastering Lab (Ojai, CA).
 A&R – Mitchell Cohen
 Liner Notes – Mitchell Cohen
 Production Coordinator – Brandi Whitmore
 Additional Coordination – Veronica Bekov and Mary Hogan
 Art Direction – Nancy Donald and Mary Maurer
 Design – Mary Maurer
 Photography – Sheryl Nields
 Illustration – Kevo Sassouni
 Music Contractor – Susie Katayama
 Music Copyist – Betty Ross-Blumer
 Management – Adam Epstein, Maggie Reinhart, David Simone and Winston Simone.

Charts and certifications

Weekly charts

Certifications

References

2004 albums
Wilson Phillips albums
Columbia Records albums
Covers albums
Albums arranged by David Campbell (composer)
Albums produced by Peter Asher